Hermitage Green is a hamlet near the village of Winwick in Cheshire, England. It is also the location of St Oswald's Well.

During 2006 the series Eleventh Hour, episode "Resurrection" was filmed in Hermitage Green Lane.

References

Villages in Cheshire